Torsten Tiebout is a classical and jazz musician (viola and violin) from Helsinki.

Tiebout is alumnus of the Internationale Händel-Akademie in Karlsruhe, Germany. Currently (2020) he is a member of the Helsinki Philharmonic Orchestra and the chamber orchestra Avanti! in Helsinki. In addition to classical concerts, he has played together with the jazz musicians John Storgårds and Antti Sarpila and with the rock musician Pave Maijanen, among others.

In his spare time, he has played football for various clubs in the hobby league in Helsinki since 2012, including the German immigrant club FC Germania Helsinki.

Discography (selected) 
Pehr Henrik Nordgren Violin Concerto No. 4 / Cronaca, 1996, Ondine
Yari Ihanat naiset rannalla / Tuliportaat, 1998, Pyramid
Pave Maijanen Mestarit Areenalla, 1999, Emi Finland/BMG Finland
Antti Sarpila, Severi Pyysalo New moods, new sounds, 2001, Blue Note Records
Erkki-Sven Tüür Oxymoron, 2007, ECM Records
Johanna Grüssner, Patrick Wingren, Marcus Söderström & Wegeliuskvartetten I Sagans Värld, 2014, Wonderland
Torsten Tiebout, Päivi Severeide, Erica Nygård Ensemble Transparent : Finnish Music for Flute, Viola and Harp, 2020, Pilfink Records

References

External links 
 
 Torsten Tiebout's profile, Helsinki Philharmonic Orchestra

Living people
21st-century classical violinists
Musicians from Helsinki
Jazz musicians
Year of birth missing (living people)